The following lists events that happened during 1811 in Australia.

Incumbents
Monarch - George III

Governors
Governors of the Australian colonies:
Governor of New South Wales – Lachlan Macquarie
Lieutenant-Governor of Tasmania – unfilled until 1813

Events
1 February – John Oxley is appointed Surveyor-General of New South Wales.
2 December – Reverend Samuel Marsden sent the first commercial shipment of wool from New South Wales to England.

Exploration and settlement
1 December – During a tour of Van Diemen's Land, Governor Macquarie gave directions for the layout of Hobart.  There was a central square and seven streets named Macquarie, Liverpool, Argyle, Elizabeth, Murray, Harrington and Collins.

Births
21 July – Robert Mackenzie, future Premier of Queensland from August 1867 to November 1868.

Deaths
5 April – Thomas Reibey, husband of Mary Reibey, leaving her in control of large colonial business enterprises.

References

 
Australia
Years of the 19th century in Australia